The 1990–91 Virginia Cavaliers men's basketball team represented University of Virginia as a member of the Atlantic Coast Conference during the 1990–91 NCAA Division I men's basketball season. The team was led by first-year head coach Jeff Jones. The Cavaliers earned an at-large bid to the NCAA tournament as #7 seed in the West region. They were defeated in the opening round by BYU, 61–48. The Cavaliers finished with a record of 21–12 (6–8 ACC).

Roster

Schedule and results

|-
!colspan=9 style=| Regular season

|-
!colspan=9 style=| ACC Tournament

|-
!colspan=9 style=| NCAA tournament

Rankings

References

Virginia Cavaliers men's basketball seasons
Virginia
Virginia
Virgin
Virgin